The Heritage Crafts Association is a registered United Kingdom charity set up to support and promote traditional crafts. Since October 2021 it has been operating under the name Heritage Crafts.

The charity was launched at the Victoria & Albert Museum in March 2010, with a membership programme for supporters.

Heritage Crafts initiated a 30-minute adjournment debate on the state of traditional crafts in Westminster in June 2009.

In May 2017, in association with The Radcliffe Trust, the Association published the HCA Red List of Endangered Crafts, which was repeated again in March 2019 and May 2021, when it was funded by The Pilgrim Trust. This publication was also covered on Woman's Hour.

In 2020, the charity's President, King Charles III, launched The President's Award for Endangered Crafts, which was won in 2020 by Ernest Wright scissor makers and in 2021 by watchmaker Dr Rebecca Struthers.

Trustees and patrons 
The President of the Heritage Crafts Association is King Charles III and it is run by a board of trustees, including Co-Chair Jay Blades MBE (furniture restorer and presenter of BBC1 The Repair Shop) and Robin Wood MBE (professional wood turner and co-founder of Spoonfest with Barn the Spoon).

Ambassadors include:
Will Kirk - furniture restorer and television presenter
Kaffe Fassett – textile designer
Alex Langlands – archaeologist and star of Victorian Farm and Tales from the Green Valley
Rose Sinclair - lecturer in Design at Goldsmiths, University of London

See also
Crafts Council

References

External links
Heritage Crafts Association

Crafts organizations
2010 establishments in the United Kingdom
Charities based in England